These are the official results of the Women's Triple Jump event at the 1995 IAAF World Championships in Gothenburg, Sweden. There were a total number of 32 participating athletes, with two qualifying groups and the final held on Thursday August 10, 1995.

This event was jumping in the same facility as Jonathan Edwards had set the still standing world record for men just three days earlier. Over the course of his series, Edwards had added 32 cm to Willie Banks' previous record that had stood for over a decade. The leader from the qualifying round was former world record holder Iolanda Chen.

The final started uneventfully with Rodica Mateescu taking the lead with 14.44m. The second round intensified with world record holder and defending champion Anna Biryukova jumping 14.85m to take the lead and Iva Prandzheva moving into second with a 14.76m.

The third round became eventful. Biryukova jumped 15.08m, within one cm of her existing world record. Meanwhile Inessa Kravets had fouled on her first two attempts, and a third foul would mean she was eliminated from the competition with no mark.

She adjusted her run up to be sure she would make a legal jump. Giving up almost the entire 20 cm width of the take off board, she took off at the back of the board. On three smooth, elongated steps she flew well past the 15 metre mark into the pit. Erom where she took off, the jump was closer to 15.78m.

The competition continued. In the fourth round, Inna Lasovskaya jumped 14.85m to move into third place.  In the fifth round Prandzheva jumped past Lasovskaya and Biryukova with a 15.18m, at that point in time, the second best jump in history only to the world record set minutes earlier.  And in the final round, Prandzheva again jumped 15.00m exactly, only her second best jump of the day.

Almost a year later, Kravets showed her jump was not a fluke, jumping 15.33m to win at the 1996 Olympics; Prandzheva was disqualified at those Olympics for a doping violation.  Kravets was unable to defend her Olympic title in 2000 because she was suspended for the second time in her career for a doping violation.

At the 2020 Olympics,  Yulimar Rojas of Venezuela jumped 15.67m on her final jump to finally break Kravets' world record after 26 years.

Medalists

Schedule
All times are Central European Time (UTC+1)

Qualifying round
Held on Tuesday 1995-08-08

Qualification: Qualifying Performance 14.05 (Q) or at least 12 best performers (q) advance to the final.

Qualifying round
Held on Saturday 1997-08-02

Final

See also
 1996 Women's Olympic Triple Jump

References
 Results
 IAAF

T
Triple jump at the World Athletics Championships
1995 in women's athletics